The Southern Professional Hockey League (SPHL) is a professional ice hockey independent minor league based in Huntersville, North Carolina, with teams located primarily in the southeastern United States as well as Illinois and Indiana in the midwestern United States.

Following the 2021–22 season, the Peoria Rivermen are the reigning President's Cup champions. As of 2022, the Knoxville Ice Bears are the most successful team in SPHL history, having won five William B. Coffey Trophies as the regular season champions and four President's Cup playoff championships. The Peoria Rivermen have also won four William B. Coffey Trophies, while Pensacola has also won four President's Cups.

History 
The SPHL's history traces back to three other short-lived leagues. The Atlantic Coast Hockey League started play in the 2002–03 season.  After its only season, the ACHL dissolved with member teams forming the nucleus for two rival leagues, the South East Hockey League and the World Hockey Association 2.  After one season the SEHL and WHA2 disbanded, with their surviving teams rejoining with two expansion teams to form the SPHL, commencing with the 2004–05 season.

In 2009, the SPHL saw a large expansion with three new franchises, in Biloxi, Mississippi, Lafayette, Louisiana and Pensacola, Florida.  In 2010, the league added an expansion team in Augusta, Georgia, another former long time ECHL market. For the 2011–12 season, the league added two-time Central Hockey League champions, the Mississippi RiverKings. For the 2013–14 season, the league lost the Augusta RiverHawks but also expanded northward with two franchises in Illinois: the Bloomington Thunder, a team also moving from the CHL, where they were known as the Bloomington Blaze, and the Peoria Rivermen, who were replacing an American Hockey League team of the same name in their market. In 2015, the Augusta franchise returned and relocated to Macon, Georgia as the Macon Mayhem.

In November 2014, Shannon Szabados became the first female goaltender to win an SPHL game, when the Columbus Cottonmouths defeated the Fayetteville FireAntz 5–4 in overtime. In that same game Erin Blair and Katie Guay became the first female officials to referee an SPHL game.

At the end of the 2015–16 season, the Louisiana IceGators announced a one-year leave of absence for renovations to their arena but never returned. The IceGators' franchise was sold and reactivated as the Quad City Storm in 2018. Then in 2016, the dormant Mississippi Surge franchise was relocated to Southwest Virginia to become the Roanoke Rail Yard Dawgs. One of the inaugural SPHL teams, the Columbus Cottonmouths, suspended operations in 2017 after failing to find a buyer while an expansion team called the Birmingham Bulls were accepted into the league as the tenth team. Following the 2017–18 season, the Mississippi RiverKings suspended operations while the league searched for new owners. With the acceptance of the Quad City Storm, the league was able to remain at ten teams for the 2018–19 season.

Due to the COVID-19 pandemic, the 2019–20 season was curtailed and no champion was named. The following season, the league announced it would only play with five of the ten member teams due to pandemic-related capacity restrictions barring fans from attending games. During the season, the league approved of the Vermilion County Bobcats as a 2021–22 expansion team based in Danville, Illinois.

Teams

2022–23 members

Note

Timeline

Defunct and relocated teams
Asheville Aces (2004–05)
Augusta RiverHawks (2010–13) Moved to Macon, Georgia, as the Mayhem for the 2015–16 season.
Bloomington Thunder (2013–14) Membership terminated to make way for a team in the United States Hockey League.
Columbus Cottonmouths (2004–17) Inaugural member of the SPHL, suspended operations when ownership could no longer fund the team; could return under new ownership; in 2019 Columbus moved to the FPHL league and became the Columbus River Dragons.
Florida Seals (2005–07) Membership terminated in the middle of the 2006–07 SPHL season.
Jacksonville Barracudas (2004–08) Suspended for the 2008–09 season and dissolved.
Louisiana IceGators (2009–16) Suspended operations for the 2016–17 season claiming the arena needed the year for renovations but later dissolved. In 2018, the franchise was sold and became the Quad City Storm.
Macon Trax (2004–05)
Mississippi RiverKings (2011–18) Joined from the Central Hockey League in 2011, ownership suspended operations in 2018 while the league searches for new owners.
Mississippi Surge (2009–14) Moved to Roanoke, Virginia, as the Rail Yard Dawgs for the 2016–17 season.
Pee Dee Cyclones (2005–07) Moved to Winston-Salem, North Carolina.
Richmond Renegades (2006–09)
Twin City Cyclones (2007–09)
Vermilion County Bobcats (2021-23) Ceased operations on February 9, 2023 after 88 games played.
Winston-Salem Polar Twins (2004–05)

Key rule differences 
As per minor leagues, there are some rule differences between the SPHL and the NHL (and even the ECHL and the AHL, the two official developmental leagues regulated by the Professional Hockey Players' Association).

 A team may dress eighteen regular players to a game. Two players dressed for the game will be goaltenders.
 A mouthpiece is required for all players except the goaltender.
 No curvature of stick limitations as in the NHL, AHL, and ECHL.
 Shootouts are five players. After five different players have made an attempt, teams may reuse anyone including those who have previously attempted in later rounds, even using the same player in consecutive rounds if desired.

Champions

President's Cup
Awarded to the league playoff champion.

William B. Coffey Trophy
Originally known as the Commissioner's Cup, the regular season championship trophy was renamed in honor of league co-founder Bill Coffey during the 2007–08 season.

See also
List of developmental and minor sports leagues
List of ice hockey leagues
Minor league

References

External links

Southern Professional Hockey League website

 
Professional ice hockey leagues in the United States
Minor league ice hockey
Sports in the Southern United States
Companies based in Charlotte, North Carolina
2004 establishments in the United States
Sports leagues established in 2004